The United States National Mountain Bike Championships are held annually to decide the cycling champions in the mountain biking discipline, across various categories.

Men

Cross-country

Downhill

Marathon

Women

Cross-country

Downhill

Marathon

References

Cycle races in the United States
Recurring sporting events established in 1984
1984 establishments in the United States
National mountain bike championships
Mountain biking events in the United States